This was the first edition of the women's event.

Alison Van Uytvanck won the title, defeating Yulia Putintseva in the final, 1–6, 6–4, 6–3.

Seeds

Draw

Finals

Top half

Bottom half

Qualifying

Seeds

Qualifiers

Lucky loser

Draw

First qualifier

Second qualifier

Third qualifier

Fourth qualifier

Fifth qualifier

Sixth qualifier

External links
 Main draw
 Qualifying draw

Astana Open - Singles